Taiawhio Tikawenga Te Tau (1860–1939) was a notable New Zealand  farmer, horse breeder, religious leader and local politician. Of Māori descent, he identified with the Ngai Tumapuhiarangi and Ngati Kahungunu iwi. He was born in Turanganui, Wairarapa, New Zealand in 1860.

References

1860 births
1939 deaths
Ngāti Kahungunu people
New Zealand racehorse owners and breeders
New Zealand Māori religious leaders
Māori politicians
People from the Wairarapa